Sahina Mumtaz Begum is an Indian politician. In 2019 she was elected as MLA of Naoda Vidhan Sabha Constituency in West Bengal Legislative Assembly. She is an All India Trinamool Congress politician. She is Nasiruddin Khan's daughter-in-law.

References

Living people
Trinamool Congress politicians from West Bengal
Women in West Bengal politics
West Bengal MLAs 2016–2021
Year of birth missing (living people)
21st-century Indian women politicians